Oliver Marach and Mate Pavić were the defending champions but lost in the first round to Damir Džumhur and Dušan Lajović.

David Goffin and Pierre-Hugues Herbert won the title, defeating Robin Haase and Matwé Middelkoop in the final, 5–7, 6–4, [10–4].

Seeds

Draw

Draw

References
Main Draw

Qatar ExxonMobil Open - Doubles
2019 Qatar ExxonMobil Open
Qatar Open (tennis)